Osterholz – Verden is an electoral constituency (German: Wahlkreis) represented in the Bundestag. It elects one member via first-past-the-post voting. Under the current constituency numbering system, it is designated as constituency 34. It is located in northern Lower Saxony, comprising the districts of Osterholz and Verden.

Osterholz – Verden was created for the inaugural 1949 federal election. It was abolished in 2002 and re-established in the 2009 federal election. Since 2009, it has been represented by Andreas Mattfeldt of the Christian Democratic Union (CDU).

Geography
Osterholz – Verden is located in northern Lower Saxony. As of the 2021 federal election, it comprises the entirety of the districts of Osterholz and Verden.

History
Osterholz – Verden was created in 1949, then known as Verden – Rotenburg – Osterholz. In the 1965 through 1983 elections, it was named Verden. From 1987 until its abolition, it was named Verden – Osterholz. In the inaugural Bundestag election, it was Lower Saxony constituency 12 in the numbering system. From 1953 through 1961, it was number 34. From 1965 until its abolition, it was number 29. Originally, the constituency comprised the districts of Verden, Osterholz, and Rotenburg. In the 1980 election, the district of Rotenburg was transferred away. Verden – Osterholz was abolished in the 2002 election, and was divided between the new constituencies of Cuxhaven – Osterholz and Rotenburg – Verden.

The constituency was re-established in the 2009 election, acquiring the name Osterholz – Verden. It was constituency number 35, then number 34 since the 2013 election. Its borders have not changed since its re-establishment.

Members
The constituency was first held by Hans-Joachim von Merkatz of the German Party (DP), who served from 1949 until 1961. In 1961, Karl Ravens of the Social Democratic Party (SPD) won the constituency. In the 1965 election, von Merkatz regained his seat, now as a candidate of the Christian Democratic Union (CDU). Ravens won the constituency again in 1969, and served until 1980. He was succeeded by fellow SPD member Arne Börnsen, who served a single term before Martin Oldenstädt of the CDU won the constituency in 1983. In the 1987 election, Börnsen returned as representative. He served until 1998, when he was succeeded by fellow SPD member Joachim Stünker, who served a single term before the constituency was abolished in 2002. Upon its re-establishment, it was won by the CDU's Andreas Mattfeldt. He was re-elected in 2013, 2017, and 2021.

Election results

2021 election

2017 election

2013 election

2009 election

References

Federal electoral districts in Lower Saxony
1949 establishments in West Germany
Constituencies established in 1949